Khaparkheda Thermal Power Station is located in Khaperkheda Town Nagpur district in the Indian state of Maharashtra. The power plant is one of the oldest coal based power plants of MAHAGENCO. The coal for the power plant is sourced from Saoner and Dumri Khurd mines of Western Coalfields Limited (WCL).Mainly coal transport through the Indian Railways. Now coal India has opened many mines in nearby areas and these mines are also providing coal to the power plant, specially to the new power plant which is of 500 MW. Source of water for the power plant is from Pench reservoir through a pond of Koradi Thermal Power Station (KTPS). Since the new power plant has begun operations, locals have reported increase in dust leading to many health conditions. This is due to low quality equipment used in the power plant

Capacity

References

Coal-fired power stations in Maharashtra
Nagpur district
1989 establishments in Maharashtra
Energy infrastructure completed in 1989
20th-century architecture in India